The Glasgow Subway is an underground rail service in Scotland that serves the city of Glasgow.  The Subway is the second oldest underground rail service in Great Britain, first place is the London Underground.

The system comprises one circular line, with two sets of rail that operate in alternative directions.  The system also travels underneath the River Clyde.

Stations 
Listed in clockwise order from Partick.

References

 
Glasgow Subway